Edward Heneage Wynne-Finch (born Edward Heneage Wynne)  (9 December 1842 – 7 January 1914) was a Welsh first-class cricketer and barrister.

The son of the cricketer and politician Charles Wynne, he was born in December 1842 at Voelas Hall near Pentrefoelas, Denbighshire. He was educated at Eton College, before going up to Trinity College, Cambridge. He played first-class cricket for the Marylebone Cricket Club on three occasions in 1864 and 1866, playing twice against Cambridge University in 1864 and against the Surrey Club in 1866 at The Oval. He scored 20 runs in his three first-class matches, in addition to taking 2 wickets with his right-arm off break bowling.

A student of the Inner Temple, Wynne became a barrister after graduating from Cambridge and was called to the bar in 1868. He later added the additional surname of Finch to his surname. He held the office of justice of the peace for both Denbighshire and the North Riding of Yorkshire. Wynne-Finch died in January 1914 at Stokesley Manor in Stokesley, North Yorkshire. His uncle, John Wynne, was also a first-class cricketer, while his aunt was Charlotte Godley, a community leader in New Zealand.

References

External links

1842 births
1914 deaths
Sportspeople from Conwy County Borough
People educated at Eton College
Alumni of Trinity College, Cambridge
Welsh cricketers
Marylebone Cricket Club cricketers
Members of the Inner Temple
Welsh barristers
Welsh justices of the peace
English barristers